Cedrick Jerome Bowers (born February 10, 1978) is a former left-handed Major League Baseball pitcher. 

In , he went to Japan, where he pitched for three seasons in Nippon Professional Baseball.

After spending  pitching in Korea, Bowers signed a minor league contract with the Rockies before the  season. He was called up for the first time in his career on July 1, and made his major league debut with the Rockies on July 2. He became a free agent at the end of the season and re-signed with the Rockies on January 14, . Bowers was later released by the Rockies and signed a minor league contract with the Philles. On December 14, 2009, he was signed by the Oakland Athletics.

References

External links
, or Retrosheet, or Korea Baseball Organization, or Pura Pelota (VPBL stats)

1978 births
Living people
American expatriate baseball players in Japan
American expatriate baseball players in South Korea
Baseball players from Gainesville, Florida
Cardenales de Lara players
Charleston RiverDogs players
Colorado Rockies players
Colorado Springs Sky Sox players
Durham Bulls players
Gulf Coast Devil Rays players
Hanwha Eagles players
KBO League pitchers
Lehigh Valley IronPigs players
Leones del Caracas players
Major League Baseball pitchers
Navegantes del Magallanes players
American expatriate baseball players in Venezuela
Oakland Athletics players
Orlando Rays players
Sacramento River Cats players
Somerset Patriots players
St. Petersburg Devil Rays players
Tigres de Aragua players
Tohoku Rakuten Golden Eagles players
Yokohama BayStars players